are a seven-piece Japanese ska band with strong pop and punk influences.

History
They formed in 2004 in Nagoya. In 2005, they released their debut EP, "Soul Fresh!". The vocalist of the band g-yun was soon recognized by fashion magazines. With the help of her appearances in the magazines, interest in the band soon picked up. It only took three months for the group to get a record deal with the indie label, Run Run Run Records. In 2006, the group re-released their debut EP, "Soul Fresh!" under their new record label. 2006 also saw the release of the debut single "Shou Koi Yubi Koiyubi", which was in the Oricon charts for 3 weeks. Two months after the singles release, Gollbetty's first full-length album "Golling!!" was released. The album only had the one single. The album was in the Oricon charts for four weeks at number 66. The band toured soon after the release to support the album. In late 2006, Gollbetty released their second single "Easy Going". The single stayed in the charts for two weeks. In 2007, the band released their third single "Snow Fall" which came with a DVD. The single charted in the top 30.
Gollbetty broke up in May 2010, after the completion of their Final Tour, issuing the retrospective CD, "Gollbetty Best."

Members

Current members
 g-yun - vocals
 MISSY - guitar
 CLASSY - bass
 Mush - drums
 TAKA-P - saxophone
 SHODAI - trumpet
 HIROAKI - trombone

Former members
 AKI 3 - drums

Discography

Albums
 2006: Golling!!
 2007: Goll & Response!!
 2008: Betty's Buggy
 2009: Scramble

EPs
 2005: Soul Fresh!

DVDs
 2007: Rollon!
 2009: Betty's Buggy Tour

Singles
 2006: Shou Koi Yubi ~Koiyubi~
 2006: Easy Going
 2007: Snow Fall
 2008: Cool Music
 2008: Sakurail
 2008: Crystal/ 99%
 2009: Secret Word
 2009: If

Compilations
 2006: Hime Ska - Princess Ska
 2006: Gelugugu Amigos
 2006: King Of 69 Tribe - The Final
 2007: Shonen Kamikaze - Master'd
 2010: Gollbetty Best

External links
 Gollbetty Official Website 

Japanese rock music groups
Japanese pop rock music groups
Japanese ska groups
Toy's Factory artists
Musical groups from Aichi Prefecture